Mickey McCarty (November 15, 1946 – July 21, 2010) was a professional American football player who played tight end for one season for the Kansas City Chiefs.   McCarty was drafted by the Chicago Bulls of the NBA (15th round, 183rd overall pick in the 1968 draft), MLB's Cleveland Indians (25th round of the 1968 draft) and the Dallas Chaparrals of the ABA.

References

1946 births
2010 deaths
American football tight ends
Chicago Bulls draft picks
Dallas Chaparrals draft picks
Kansas City Chiefs players
TCU Horned Frogs men's basketball players
TCU Horned Frogs baseball players
TCU Horned Frogs football players
American Football League players
American men's basketball players